Caneira is a surname. Notable people with the surname include:

 John Caneira (born 1952), American baseball player
 Marco Caneira (born 1979), Portuguese international footballer